"I've Got to Be Somebody" is a song written by Joe South and was recorded by Billy Joe Royal for his 1965 album, Down in the Boondocks. It was released as a single in December 1965 and the song reached #38 on The Billboard Hot 100 in January 1966. The song reached #15 on the Canadian chart the same month.

Joe South later released a version of the song.

References

1965 singles
Songs written by Joe South
Billy Joe Royal songs
Joe South songs
Columbia Records singles
1965 songs